Nabara Dam is a dam in the Hiroshima Prefecture of Japan.

Dams in Hiroshima Prefecture
Dams completed in 1976
Ōta River